The Morocco Olympic football team represents Morocco in international football competitions in Olympic Games. The selection is limited to players under the age of 23, except three overage players. The team is controlled by the Fédération Royale Marocaine de Football (FRMF).

History
Morocco appeared the first in the Olympic games in 1964.

The second appearance was supposed to be during the 1968 Summer Olympics in Mexico but Morocco refused to allow its team to play against Israel national team because of political issues. Then Ghana national team took the advantage and replaced Morocco in the final competition.

In 1972, Morocco reached the second round after a draw against USA and a win against Malaysia national team.

Morocco was very close to reach the Quarter final during the 2004 Summer Olympics but the goals difference was in the favor of U-23 Costa Rica after all the teams played their three games.
Morocco qualified for the 2012 London Olympic games after beating Egypt 3–2 in the semi-finals of the African Cup under-23 on December 7, 2012.

Morocco had organized the 2011 CAF U-23 Championship and got qualified to the 2012 Summer Olympics after reaching the final game, then the olympic team lost against the surprise of the tournament Gabon by the score of 2–1 at Marrakech Stadium.

Olympic games record

* Under-23 tournament since 1992.

CAF U-23 Championship

UNAF U-23 Tournament

Islamic Solidarity Games

Current team status

2021 Islamic Solidarity Games

Group B

Players

Current squad
Squad for 2021 Islamic Solidarity Games.

Coach: Hicham Dmiai

The squad was announced on 27 July.

* Over-aged player.

Previous squads

Football at the Summer Olympics squads
 Olympics 1992 squad
 Olympics 2000 squad
 Olympics 2004 squad
 Olympics 2012 squad

CAF U-23 Championship squads
 CAF U-23 2011 squad

Football at the Islamic Solidarity Games
 Islamic Games 2005
 Islamic Games 2013
 Islamic Games 2017
 Islamic Games 2021

Overage players in Olympic Games

References

African national under-23 association football teams
under-23